The Old Statehouse Historic District is an area in downtown Frankfort, Kentucky near the old State Capitol and the Old Governors Mansion. The area is bounded by Broadway Street, Blanton Street, St. Clair Street, Ann Street and High Street and contains 74 historic buildings. The historic district was added to the United States National Register of Historic Places in 1980.

The district "represents an old, stable, and diversified middle-class neighborhood whose residents have serviced the government and the city throughout its existence."

References

Federal architecture in Kentucky
National Register of Historic Places in Frankfort, Kentucky
Geography of Franklin County, Kentucky
Historic districts on the National Register of Historic Places in Kentucky
African-American history of Kentucky